The Shillelagh Tournament was a Division I men's college ice hockey tournament hosted annually during the NCAA Division I men's ice hockey season by the Notre Dame Fighting Irish men's ice hockey program. It was first held during the 2008–09 NCAA Division I men's ice hockey season as the  successor to the Lightning College Hockey Classic. After the Tampa Bay Lightning withdrew as tournament sponsor because of ownership changes, the Notre Dame Fighting Irish men's ice hockey program took control of the event, moving it to the Sears Centre in Hoffman Estates, Illinois.

The tournament is named after the shillelagh, a wooden club typically made from blackthorn or oak with a large knob on the end that is associated with Ireland and Irish folklore. The Notre Dame Fighting Irish football program has annually exchanged the Shillelagh Trophy with the Northwestern Wildcats from 1930–c. 1973, the Shillelagh Trophy with the Purdue Boilermakers since 1957, and the Jeweled Shillelagh with the USC Trojans since 1952.

Notre Dame won the inaugural Shillelagh Tournament, defeating the University of Minnesota Duluth 3–1 in the final game. After three seasons, the tournament was shelved for a couple years, leading some fans to believe it had run its course. But Notre Dame finally renewed it as a Thanksgiving tournament in November 2013 (rather than a New Year's tournament as it had been prior), in which the Irish were upset in the championship game. This renewal also moved the tournament from Hoffman Estates to Notre Dame's own Compton Family Ice Arena. The tournament did not return for the 2017–18 season.

Results

References
General

Specific

External links
Notre Dame Fighting Irish men's ice hockey
Shillelagh Tournament history

Notre Dame Fighting Irish ice hockey
College ice hockey tournaments in the United States